The Cold Fire was a wildfire that started on August 2, 2016 in the Vaca Mountains, near Lake Berryessa and just west of the city of Winters, in Yolo County, northern California.

Events
The fire was first reported at 4:36 pm on August 2 near Highway 128 west of Pleasants Valley Road. By sundown mandatory evacuations were ordered for Canyon Creek Campground and Golden Bear Estates.

A Red Cross shelter was briefly setup in Winters but was closed due to lack of use. 

The fire was contained by 6 PM on August 11. The Cold Fire caused an estimated $100,000 in damages. In total,  acres had been burned and two hunting cabins had been destroyed. The cause of the fire remains under investigation.

References

2016 California wildfires
Wildfires in Yolo County, California
Vaca Mountains
History of Yolo County, California
Winters, California